The Ferrari F2003-GA was a highly successful car used by Scuderia Ferrari in the 2003 Formula One World Championship. The chassis was designed by Rory Byrne, Ignazio Lunetta, Aldo Costa, Marco Fainello, Nikolas Tombazis and James Allison with Ross Brawn playing a vital role in leading the production of the car as the team's Technical Director and Paolo Martinelli assisted by Giles Simon leading the engine design and operations. Its development was based on the previous Ferrari F2002, but featured new bulbous sidepods and a lengthened wheelbase to aid aerodynamics. The engine and gearbox were developed versions of the previous model.  The car was designated "GA" as a mark of respect to Gianni Agnelli, the recently deceased head of Fiat.

The car was introduced just before mid season in 2003, as the F2002 was seen as good enough to be competitive whilst the F2003-GA was developed further. The car was fast and competitive as it won 3 out its first 4 races, but had a tendency to overuse its tyres, which led to several late race tyre problems in mid seasons, causing a slight drop in form during the unusually hot European summer. As a result, Williams and McLaren were able to mount a consistent challenge to Ferrari and push Michael Schumacher for the championship.

After Bridgestone engineers discovered Michelin were using tyres which changed construction, causing the French tyre maker to provide remoulded tyres late in the season. Ferrari became competitive again as it won the final 3 races of the season, and were able to hold off both Williams and McLaren for the Constructors' Championship, whilst Schumacher snatched his sixth Drivers' title, breaking Juan Manuel Fangio's record which had stood for 46 years.

The car won seven races, five pole positions, and five fastest laps before being replaced with the dominant F2004 in 2004, a car which was almost identical to its predecessor.

On 11 December 2003, after the season had finished, Michael Schumacher raced the car against a Eurofighter Typhoon of the Italian Air Force over several measured distances to determine which was faster, the aircraft or the car. The German won the first run, over the distance of 600 metres, thanks to the weight advantage of his car over the jet, but the Typhoon won the two remaining runs over the longer distances of 900 and 1200 metres, winning the overall race.

Ferrari used 'Marlboro' logos, except at the French, British and United States Grands Prix.

In November 2022, chassis number 229, which Schumacher used to win 5 Grands Prix during the 2003 season, was sold at auction by RM Sotheby's during Sotheby’s Luxury Week in Geneva, Switzerland. The car, complete with engine and in full running condition, sold for a world record price of CHF14,630,000 ($14,873,327 USD).

Complete Formula One results
(key) (results in bold indicate pole position, results in italics indicate fastest lap)

* 32 points scored with the F2002B

References

F2003-GA
2003 Formula One season cars
Formula One championship-winning cars